Gabriel is a 2014 Independent psychological thriller drama film written and directed by Lou Howe and starring Rory Culkin.  It is Howe's directorial debut.

Plot
A troubled young man searches obsessively for his first love, risking everything in an increasingly desperate pursuit.

Cast
Rory Culkin as Gabriel
Deirdre O'Connell as Meredith
David Call as Matthew
Emily Meade as Alice
Lynn Cohen as Nonny
Louisa Krause as Sarah
Alexia Rasmussen as Kelly
Frank De Julio as Paul
Desmin Borges as Rudy
Sean Cullen as Jonathan Norton

Reception
The film has an 84% rating on Rotten Tomatoes.  Eric Kohn of IndieWire graded the film a B+.  Matt Zoller Seitz of RogerEbert.com awarded the film three stars.  Mike D'Angelo of The A.V. Club graded the film a B.  Clayton Dillard of Slant Magazine awarded the film one and a half stars out of four.

References

External links
 
 

2014 films
American independent films
American thriller drama films
2014 directorial debut films
2010s English-language films
2010s American films